Ygnacio may refer to:

Given name:
Ygnacio Coronel (1795–1862), settler in the Pueblo de Los Ángeles of Mexican Alta California
Luis Ygnacio Liendo (born 1980), amateur Venezuelan Greco-Roman wrestler in the men's lightweight category
Ygnacio Martínez (1774–1848), important figure in the development of Contra Costa County, California
Ygnacio Sepulveda (1842–1916), one of the first two judges of the Superior Court in Los Angeles County, California
Ygnacio del Valle (1808–1880), rancher and landowner in the eastern Santa Clara River Valley, California, United States
Ygnacio Vallejo (1807–1890), Californio military commander, politician, and rancher

Places:
San Ygnacio (disambiguation)
San Ygnacio Creek, small stream of water located in Webb County, Texas
Ygnacio Palomares Adobe, a one-story adobe in Pomona, California, built between 1850 and 1855 as a residence for Don Ygnacio Palomares

See also